

See also
Cinema of South Korea
List of film festivals in Asia
List of music festivals in South Korea
List of festivals in South Korea

References

 
 
 
 

 
Festivals
South Korea
South Korea
Film